Steven Hamilton (born 19 March 1975) is a Scottish former footballer who played mainly as a right back.

He began his career at Kilmarnock, and was a squad member when Killie won the Scottish Cup in 1997 though was not in the 14-man pool for the final itself. He was an unused substitute in their 1997–98 UEFA Cup Winners' Cup fixtures, as well as in the 1997–98 UEFA Cup after the Rugby Park club finished fourth in the 1997–98 Scottish Premier Division, but was unable to break into the team on a regular basis.

Hamilton then dropped down the divisions with spells at Raith Rovers, Albion Rovers, Stenhousemuir, Brechin City and Alloa Athletic. He later worked as a football development officer in roles with the Scottish Football Association (in partnership with Braidhurst High School and North Lanarkshire Council) and with Kilmarnock.

References

Living people
1975 births
Scottish footballers
Footballers from Glasgow
People from Baillieston
Brechin City F.C. players
Stenhousemuir F.C. players
Alloa Athletic F.C. players
Kilmarnock F.C. players
Troon F.C. players
Albion Rovers F.C. players
Raith Rovers F.C. players
Scottish Premier League players
Scottish Junior Football Association players
Scottish Football League players
Kilmarnock F.C. non-playing staff
Association football fullbacks
Association football coaches